Martin Kennedy  was named as the Kansas Acting Secretary of Aging by Governor Mark Parkinson. Kennedy replaced Secretary Kathy Greenlee who became the Assistant Secretary for Aging at the U.S. Department of Health and Human Services.

Kennedy has been with the Kansas Department on Aging since 2004 and was named Deputy Secretary last November. Previously, the Acting Secretary served in finance and management roles, including Controller for the Kansas Insurance Department and as a Principal Analyst in the Kansas Division of the Budget. He earned his Master’s in Public Administration from Kansas State University.

Kennedy served as interim Secretary when Kathy Greenlee was confirmed as Assistant Secretary for Aging at the U.S. Department of Health and Human Services in late June. The Governor’s Cabinet is subject to Kansas Senate Confirmation. While the Legislature is adjourned, the Senate Oversight Committee must approve the appointment until the Senate can consider the nomination.

External links
 Kansas Department on Aging

Living people
State cabinet secretaries of Kansas
Kansas Democrats
Year of birth missing (living people)